There is no Williamston in West Virginia. You may be looking for:
Williamson, West Virginia on the Tug Fork River
Williamstown, West Virginia on the Ohio River